Thirukkovil Divisional Secretariat is a  Divisional Secretariat  of Ampara District, of Eastern Province, Sri Lanka.

GS Divisions
Thampaddai –01
Thampaddai –02
Thambiluvil - 01 East
Thambiluvil - 01 West
Thambiluvil - 01 South
Thambiluvil - 02 East
Thambiluvil - 02 West
Thambiluvil - 02 North
Thirukkovil - 01
Thirukkovil - 02
Thirukkovil - 03
Thirukkovil - 04
Vinayagapuram, Sri Lanka -01
Vinayagapuram, Sri Lanka-02
Vinayagapuram, Sri Lanka-03
Vinayagapuram, Sri Lanka-04
saagamam
Kanchirankuda
Kanchikudicharu
Thankavelayuthapuram
Thandiyadi
sankamangiramam

References
 Divisional Secretariats Portal

Divisional Secretariats of Ampara District